The 2016 IIHF World Championship was the 80th such event hosted by the International Ice Hockey Federation (IIHF), being held from 6 to 22 May 2016 in Moscow and Saint Petersburg, Russia. Canada entered the tournament as the defending 2015 champions. Hungary returned to the Championship after a 6-year absence, and Kazakhstan after a 1-year absence.

Canada won their 26th gold medal, defeating Finland 2–0 in the gold medal game. With the win Corey Perry became the second consecutive Canadian team captain to earn membership in the Triple Gold Club. Russia won the bronze medal, defeating the United States 7–2 in the bronze medal game.

Bids
There were three official bids to host these championships. The decision on who hosts the tournament was decided during the final weekend of the 2011 IIHF World Championship in Bratislava, Slovakia.

  Denmark
 Copenhagen/Herning
Denmark has never hosted these championships. The tournament was proposed to run from May 6–22, 2016 in Parken Stadium (Copenhagen, 15,000 seats) and Jyske Bank Boxen (Herning, 12,000 seats).

  Russia
 Moscow/Saint Petersburg
Russia was the only bidder to ever have hosted these championships, with the most recent being in 2007. The tournament was proposed to run from April 29 – May 15, 2016 in Megasport Arena (Moscow, 13,577 seats) and Ice Palace (Saint Petersburg, 12,300 seats).

  Ukraine
 Kyiv
Ukraine, like Denmark, has never hosted these championships. The tournament was proposed to run from May 6–22, 2016 in Palace of Sports (Kyiv, 7,000 seats) and a new 12,000 seat arena to be built by 2015 in Kyiv.

Venues

Participants

Format
The 16 teams were split into two groups of eight teams. After playing a round-robin, the top four teams advance to the knockout stage, to play out the winner. The last team of each group will be relegated to Division I the following year.

Seeding
The seeding in the preliminary round was based on the 2015 IIHF World Ranking, which ended at the conclusion of the 2015 IIHF World Championship.

Group A (Moscow)
 (2)
 (3)
 (6)
 (7)
 (10)
 (11)
 (15)
 (17)

Group B (St. Petersburg)
 (1)
 (4)
 (5)
 (8)
 (9)
 (12)
 (13)
 (19)

Rosters

Each team's roster consisted of at least 15 skaters (forwards and defencemen) and two goaltenders, and at most 22 skaters and three goaltenders. All 16 participating nations, through the confirmation of their respective national associations, had to submit a roster by the first IIHF directorate meeting.

Officials
The IIHF selected 16 referees and 16 linesmen to work the tournament.

Preliminary round
The schedule was released on 15 July 2015.

Group A

Group B

Playoff round

Quarterfinals

Semifinals

Bronze medal game

Gold medal game

Final ranking

Awards and statistics

Awards
Best players selected by the directorate:
 Best Goaltender:  Mikko Koskinen
 Best Defenceman:  Mike Matheson
 Best Forward:  Patrik Laine
Source: IIHF.com

Media All-Stars:
 MVP:  Patrik Laine
 Goaltender:  Mikko Koskinen
 Defencemen:  Nikita Zaitsev /  Mike Matheson
 Forwards:  Patrik Laine /  Vadim Shipachyov /  Mikael Granlund
Source: IIHF.com

Scoring leaders
List shows the top skaters sorted by points, then goals.

GP = Games played; G = Goals; A = Assists; Pts = Points; +/− = Plus/minus; PIM = Penalties in minutes; POS = Position
Source: IIHF.com

Goaltending leaders
Only the top five goaltenders, based on save percentage, who have played at least 40% of their team's minutes, are included in this list.

TOI = Time on ice (minutes:seconds); SA = Shots against; GA = Goals against; GAA = Goals against average; Sv% = Save percentage; SO = Shutouts
Source: IIHF.com

References

External links

 
IIHF World Championship
Iihf World Championship, 2016
World Ice Hockey Championships - Men's
IIHF World Championship
IIHF World Championship
IIHF World Championship
2016 IIHF World Championship
IIHF World Championship
2016 IIHF World Championship
Sports competitions in Saint Petersburg